Ty Chandler may refer to:

Tyson Chandler (born 1982), American basketball player and coach
Ty Chandler (American football) (born 1998), American football player